Bill McChesney (born October 3, 1948) is an American politician and member of the Democratic Party who was a member of the Montana House of Representatives, representing District 40, from 2007 to 2015. Term-limited in 2014, he ran for the 19th District of the Montana Senate but was defeated by Republican incumbent Frederick Moore. He ran for Governor of Montana in the 2016 election against Democratic incumbent Steve Bullock, but lost in the Democratic primary.

References

External links
 Montana House of Representatives - Bill McChesney official MT State Legislature website
 Project Vote Smart - Representative Bill McChesney (MT) profile
 Follow the Money - Bill McChesney
 2008 2006 campaign contributions

1948 births
Living people
Democratic Party members of the Montana House of Representatives
People from Miles City, Montana
Politicians from Missoula, Montana
University of Montana alumni